Meryl Smith (born 11 June 2001) is a Scottish rugby union player who plays as a centre.

Early life
Smith started playing rugby with the Murrayfield Wanderers Girls team aged 13. She became a student at Edinburgh University studying biomedical science from September 2019. She was capped by Scotland U18 and U20 in Touch Rugby.

Career
In 2019 Smith was called up by the Scotland senior team for the first time to compete at the World Rugby Women’s Sevens Series event in Biarritz. Smith was selected to play for Scotland at the 2022 Commonwealth Games in rugby sevens. She was also selected for the COVID-delayed 2021 Rugby World Cup held in October 2022. In December 2022 she was awarded a professional contract by Scottish Rugby.

References

2001 births
Living people
Female rugby union players
Scotland women's international rugby union players
Scottish female rugby union players
Rugby sevens players at the 2022 Commonwealth Games